Kentucky elected its members August 7, 1820.

See also 
 1820 Kentucky's 6th congressional district special election
 1820 Kentucky's 9th congressional district special election
 1821 Kentucky's 7th congressional district special election
 1821 Kentucky's 8th congressional district special election
 1820 and 1821 United States House of Representatives elections
 List of United States representatives from Kentucky

Notes 

1820
Kentucky
United States House of Representatives